Charleston is a populated place within Palmyra Township in Halifax County, North Carolina, United States.  The location did not participate in the U.S. Census, so the population is not known, but the township's population was reported as 1,182 as of 1 July 2015.

The location shares the 28274 zip code with Scotland Neck.

References

Unincorporated communities in Halifax County, North Carolina
Unincorporated communities in North Carolina